This is a list of 114 genera in the subfamily Pselaphinae, ant-loving beetles.

Pselaphinae genera

 Abdiunguis Park and Wagner, 1962 i c g
 Acolonia Casey, 1894 i c
 Actiastes Casey, 1897 i c g b
 Actium Casey, 1886 i c g b
 Actizona Chandler, 1985 i c g
 Adranes LeConte, 1849 i c g b
 Allobrox Fletcher, 1928 i c g
 Allotrimium Park, 1943 i c g
 Anchylarthron Brendel, 1887 i c g
 Anitra Casey, 1894 i c g
 Apharus Reitter, 1882 i c g
 Arianops Brendel, 1893 i c g b
 Arthmius LeConte, 1849 i c g b
 Arthromelodes Jeannel, 1954 c g
 Atinus Horn, 1868 i c g b
 Balega Reitter, 1882 i c g
 Batriasymmodes Park, 1951 i c g b
 Batrisodes Reitter, 1882 i c g b
 Berdura Reitter, 1882 i c g
 Bibloplectus Reitter, 1881 i c g b
 Bibloporus Thomson, 1859 i c g
 Biotus Casey, 1887 i c g b
 Bontomtes Grigarick and Schuster, 1980 i c g
 Brachygluta Thomson, 1859 i c g b
 Briaraxis Brendel, 1894 i c g
 Bythinoplectus Reitter, 1882 i c g
 Caccoplectus Sharp, 1887 i c g b
 Cedius LeConte, 1849 i c g b
 Ceophyllus LeConte, 1849 i c g b
 Circocerus Motschulsky, 1855 i c g
 Conoplectus Brendel, 1888 i c g b
 Ctenisis Raffray, 1890 i c g b
 Ctenisodes Raffray, 1897 i c g b
 Cupila Casey, 1897 i c g
 Custotychus Park & Wagner, 1962 i c g b
 Cylindrarctus Schaufuss, 1887 i c g b
 Dalmonexus Park, 1942 i c g
 Dalmosanus Park, 1952 i c g b
 Dalmosella Casey, 1897 i c g b
 Decarthron Brendel, 1865 i c g b
 Ephimia Reitter, 1883 i c g
 Euboarhexius Grigarick & Schuster, 1966 i c g b
 Euphalepsus Reitter, 1883 i c g
 Euplecterga Park and Wagner, 1962 i c g
 Euplectus Leach, 1817 i c g b
 Eupsenius LeConte, 1849 i c g b
 Eurhexius Sharp, 1887 i c g
 Eutrichites LeConte, 1880 i c g b
 Eutyphlus LeConte, 1880 i c g b
 Foveoscapha Park and Wagner, 1962 i c g
 Fustiger LeConte, 1866 i c g b
 Haasellia Wagner, 1984 i c g
 Hamotus Aubé, 1844 i c g b
 Hatchia Park and Wagner, 1962 i c g
 Hesperotychus Schuster and Marsh, 1958 i c g
 Kenocoelus Broun, 1911 g
 Lemelba Park, 1953 i c g
 Leptoplectus Casey, 1908 i c g b
 Lucifotychus Park & Wagner, 1962 i c g b
 Machaerodes Brendel, 1890 i c g b
 Malleoceps Park, 1954 i c g
 Mayetia Mulsant & Rey, 1875 i c g b
 Megarafonus Casey, 1897 i c g b
 Melba Casey, 1897 i c g b
 Mipseltyrus Park, 1953 i c g b
 Morius Casey, 1894 i c g b
 Nearctitychus Chandler, 1988 i c g b
 Neopselaphus Jeannel, 1951 i c g
 Neotyrus Raffray, 1895 i c g
 Nisaxis Casey, 1886 i c g b
 Oropodes Casey, 1894 i c g b
 Oropus Casey, 1886 i c g b
 Ouachitychus Chandler, 1988 i c g
 Pilactium Grigarick and Schuster, 1970 i c g
 Prespelea Park, 1953 i c g
 Pselaphus Herbst, 1792 i c g b
 Pselaptrichus Brendel, 1889 i c g b
 Pselaptus LeConte, 1880 i c g
 Pseudactium Casey, 1908 i c g b
 Pycnoplectus Casey, 1897 i c g b
 Ramecia Casey, 1894 i c g b
 Ramelbida Park, 1942 i c g
 Reichenbachia Leach, 1826 i c g b
 Rhexidius Casey, 1887 i c g b
 Rhexius LeConte, 1849 i c g b
 Rhinoscepsis LeConte, 1878 i c g
 Rybaxis Saulcy, 1876 i c g b
 Saxet Grigarick and Schuster, 1980 i c g
 Scalenarthrus LeConte, 1880 i c g
 Sebaga Raffray, 1891 i c g b
 Simplona Casey, 1897 i c g
 Sonoma Casey, 1886 i c g b
 Speleobama Park, 1951 i c g
 Speleochus Park, 1951 i c g
 Subterrochus Park, 1960 i c g
 Tetrascapha Schuster and Marsh, 1957 i c g
 Texamaurops Barr & Steeves, 1963 i c g b
 Thesiastes Casey, 1894 i c g b
 Thesium Casey, 1884 i c g b
 Tmesiphorus LeConte, 1849 i c g b
 Tomoplectus Raffray, 1898 i c g
 Trichonyx Chaudoir, 1845 i c g b
 Trigonoplectus Bowman, 1934 i c g
 Trimioarcus Park, 1952 i c g
 Trimiomelba Casey, 1897 i c g b
 Trimioplectus Brendel, 1891 i c g b
 Trimiosella Raffray, 1898 i c g
 Trimium Aubé, 1833 i c g b
 Trisignis Park and Schuster, 1955 i c g
 Tychobythinus Ganglbauer, 1896 i c g b
 Tychus Leach, 1817 c g b
 Tyrus Aubé, 1833 i c g b
 Upoluna Schaufuss, 1886 b
 Valda Casey, 1894 i c g b
 Zolium Casey, 1897 i c g
 Zonaira Grigarick and Schuster, 1980 i c g

Data sources: i = ITIS, c = Catalogue of Life, g = GBIF, b = Bugguide.net

References